Supply and demand is an economic model used to explain price changes in a market.
See also Capitalism#Supply and demand.

Supply and Demand may also refer to:

Supply and Demand (Dagmar Krause album)
Supply and Demand (Amos Lee album)
Supply & Demand (Playaz Circle album)
"Supply and Demand" (song), a song by the Hives
"Supply & Demand" (TV series), an ITV drama miniseries in the 1990s
"Supply and Demand" (CSI: NY), an episode of CSI: NY

See also
 Supply (disambiguation)
 Demand (disambiguation)